Élise Duboquet born 18 November 1981 is a French athlete, who specializes in the Pole vault.

Prize list  
 France Championships
  silver medal at the national track championships with a leap of 3.90 m in 2006 at Lamballe
 bronze medal at the national track championships with a leap of 4.10 m in 2005 at Angers

 Regional Championships
 1st in Pole Vault with a jump of 3.90 m Indoors in 2006 at Lievin
 1st in Pole Vault with a jump of 4.00 m in 2005 at Lomme
 2nd Indoors Pole Vault in 2005 at Lievin

Records 
  Pole Vault = 4.10 m

Other  
Élise was elected  Miss Flanders and 4th runner up in the national election of Miss France 2001.

See as well

External links  
 Track League Nord-Pas-de-Calais
 
  Photo of Elise Duboquet as runner-up Miss France

1981 births
Living people
French female pole vaulters